Kadarim (lit. Potters) is a kibbutz in northern Israel. Located near Maghar, it falls under the jurisdiction of Upper Galilee Regional Council.

History
The village was established in 1980 near Mount Kadarim, which was named after the potters of the village of Hananiah, famous for its pottery during the time of the Talmud and the Mishnah. Due to its proximity to a quarry at its initial site, the kibbutz was moved to its current location in 1987.

Some believe that Habakkuk is buried near Kadarim, though others put his burial place near Hokuk or at Toyserkan in Iran.

References

Kibbutzim
Kibbutz Movement
Populated places established in 1980
1980 establishments in Israel
Populated places in Northern District (Israel)